Samouil Niavradakis (born 20 February 2002) is a Greek professional footballer who plays as a centre-back.

References

2002 births
Living people
Greek footballers
Super League Greece 2 players
Platanias F.C. players
Association football defenders